Erected in 1923, the Thornton-Cleveleys War Memorial is located in the English conurbation of Thornton-Cleveleys, Lancashire. A Grade II listed structure, it stands in a small garden in the southwestern corner of a junction known as Four Lane Ends.

The war memorial, designed by Albert Toft and sculpted by W. L. Cookson, consists of a bronze statue depicting a soldier standing with a rifle.  The statue is on a square granite shaft, on a tapered plinth, on a base of two steps.  On the shaft is an inscription and the names of those lost in the First World War.  In front and at the sides of the memorial are three granite tablets in the form of open books with the names of those lost in the Second World War.  Colonel Hugh Jeudwine was present at the memorial's unveiling on 11 November 1923.

References

Sources

External links
Memorial, Thornton Cleveleys – Imperial War Museums
A photo of the memorial shortly after its completion in 1923

Grade II listed buildings in Lancashire
Cenotaphs in the United Kingdom
British military memorials and cemeteries
1923 sculptures
Sculptures by Albert Toft
Stone sculptures in the United Kingdom
Outdoor sculptures in England
Monuments and memorials in England
Buildings and structures in the Borough of Wyre
World War I memorials in England
World War II memorials in England
1923 establishments in England